The colonisation of Oceania includes:

 Colonisation of Australia
 Colonisation of New Zealand
 Colonisation of the Pacific islands

See also
 Europeans in Oceania
 Indigenous peoples of Oceania

References

 
History of Oceania
Oceania